The S.V. Lebedev Prize is an award, presented from 1943 to 1995 by the Academy of Sciences of the USSR and since 1995 by Russian Academy of Sciences, for outstanding work in the field of chemistry and technology of synthetic rubber and other synthetic polymers.

Recipients 
Source: Russian Academy of Science (in Russian)

See also

 List of chemistry awards

References 

Chemistry awards
Awards of the Russian Academy of Sciences
Awards established in 1995
USSR Academy of Sciences